O-1656 is a cannabinoid agonist which was invented by Billy R Martin and Raj K Razdan at Organix Inc in 2002. It is moderately selective for the CB2 receptor with a CB1 receptor affinity of 18 nM and a CB2 receptor affinity of 2 nM. Since it has a cycloheptyl ring attached to the phenol core, it falls outside the definition of a "cyclohexylphenol derivative", but may still be controlled by generic legislation in some jurisdictions.

See also
 CBD-DMH
 CP 55,940
 Cannabidiol
 Cannabicyclohexanol
 O-1871

References

Cannabinoids